Mezcal Head is the second studio album by English alternative rock band Swervedriver. It was released on 27 September 1993 by Creation Records in the United Kingdom and on 5 October 1993 by A&M Records in the United States.

Background and release
In 1993, Swervedriver re-emerged with the core of Adam Franklin and Jimmy Hartridge, along with newly recruited drummer Jez Hindmarsh (a.k.a. "Jez"), and released Mezcal Head. The album gave them their most successful UK single at number 60, "Duel", which NME named its "single of the week" and for which a music video was released. Franklin and Hartridge both perform bass on the album, as they were left without a bassist when Adi Vines departed before recording began.

"Never Lose That Feeling", from the 1992 EP of the same name, and the extended krautrock/drone/saxophone instrumental "Never Learn" were added as a single bonus track to the US edition of the CD. Swervedriver toured US arenas with The Smashing Pumpkins and Shudder to Think in October and November 1993.

Reception

Alternative Press ranked Mezcal Head at numbers 39 and 90 on its "90 Greatest Albums of the '90s" and "Top 99 of '85–'95" lists respectively. It was also ranked at number 265 on Spins "The 300 Best Albums of the Past 30 Years (1985–2014)" list. Pitchfork ranked the album at number 10 on its list of "The 50 Best Shoegaze Albums of All Time" in 2016.

Track listing

More information
The UK CD has "Mickey" and "Dragging It Under" printed on the CD as tracks 4 and 6. The US CD has "Harry and Maggie (Dragging It Under)" printed on the CD as track 6. The US promo is identical to the official release except that it has the word "PROMOTIONAL" printed on the CD. The Japanese edition comes with a biography and lyrics.

The tracks "Duel" and "Last Train to Satansville" were featured in the Sega Saturn, Sony PlayStation and 3DO versions of the game Road Rash.

"Duel" was featured on the 2008 video game Burnout Paradise. "Mezcal" is censored from the song's album listing in the game due to connotations with alcoholic beverages.

Personnel
Credits for Mezcal Head adapted from liner notes.

Swervedriver
 Adam Franklin – vocals, guitar
 Jimmy Hartridge – guitar
 Steve George – bass
 Jez Hindmarsh – drums, percussion
Additional musician
 Stewart Dace – saxophone 

Production
 Swervedriver – production
 Alan Moulder – production, mixing, engineering
 Nick Addison – engineering
 Jez Hindmarsh – engineering
 Ronan Keating – engineering assistant
 Howie Weinberg – mastering
Design
 Andy Vella – cover art

Charts

References

External links

 Mezcal Head at YouTube (streamed copy where licensed)

1993 albums
Albums produced by Alan Moulder
Swervedriver albums